Bjarni Mark Antonsson (born 27 December 1995) is an Icelandic footballer who plays as a midfielder for Start.

References

External links

Living people
1995 births
Bjarni Mark Antonsson
Bjarni Mark Antonsson
Association football midfielders
Superettan players
Bjarni Mark Antonsson
Bjarni Mark Antonsson
Expatriate footballers in Sweden
Kristianstad FC players
IK Brage players
Bjarni Mark Antonsson
Bjarni Mark Antonsson